Brighstone Bay is a bay on the south west coast of the Isle of Wight, England. It lies to the south and west of the village of Brighstone from which it takes its name. It faces south west towards the English Channel, its shoreline is 7 km in length and is gently curving. It stretches from Sudmoor Point in the north west to Artherfield Point in the south east. 

Several chines, some with streams like the Buddle Brook (Grange Chine) lie along this coast.

Like most of the coast along the South-West of the Island, Brighstone Bay is suffering from coastal erosion.

Projecting out from this coast is one several ledges along the Back of the Wight. Brighstone Ledge has been the site of many shipwrecks as storms drive ships onto the hidden rocks.

The seabed is a mixture of mud, sand and shells. The beach is predominantly shingle.

The bay is best viewed from along the Isle of Wight Coastal Path which follows the whole bay along the cliff top.

References

External links

Bays of the Isle of Wight
Brighstone